Erma Sulistianingsih  (born 5 November 1965) is an Indonesian badminton player.

A doubles specialist, Sulistianingsih competed in women's doubles with Rosiana Tendean at the 1992 Summer Olympics in Barcelona. Together, they won consecutive World Grand Prix Finals titles, in 1989 and 1990, and two Indonesia Opens in 1989 and 1992. They also reached two World Cup finals in 1990 in Bandung & Jakarta, Indonesia and in 1991 in Macau.
She competed at the 1989 IBF World Championships in Jakarta. In the women's doubles, together with Rosiana Tendean, she reached the quarterfinals, where they were eliminated by eventual gold medalists Lin Ying and Guan Weizhen. She reached the second round in mixed doubles with Ricky Subagdja.

Achievements

World Cup 
Women's doubles

Mixed doubles

Asian Cup 
Women's doubles

Southeast Asian Games 
Women's doubles

Mixed doubles

IBF World Grand Prix 
The World Badminton Grand Prix was sanctioned by the International Badminton Federation from 1983 to 2006.

Women's doubles

Mixed doubles

 IBF Grand Prix tournament
 IBF Grand Prix Finals tournament

References

External links 
 

1965 births
Living people
Indonesian female badminton players
Badminton players at the 1992 Summer Olympics
Olympic badminton players of Indonesia
Badminton players at the 1990 Asian Games
Asian Games silver medalists for Indonesia
Asian Games medalists in badminton
Medalists at the 1990 Asian Games
Competitors at the 1987 Southeast Asian Games
Competitors at the 1989 Southeast Asian Games
Competitors at the 1991 Southeast Asian Games
Southeast Asian Games gold medalists for Indonesia
Southeast Asian Games silver medalists for Indonesia
Southeast Asian Games medalists in badminton
21st-century Indonesian women
20th-century Indonesian women